Siaton, officially the Municipality of Siaton,  is a 1st class municipality and the southernmost settlement in the province of Negros Oriental, Philippines. According to the 2020 census, it has a population of 83,082 people.

The town is home to the Minagahat language, the indigenous language of Southern Negros as listed by the Komisyon ng Wikang Filipino. The language is vital to the culture and arts of the people.

Lake Balanan is located in Siaton.

Geography

Barangays
Siaton is politically subdivided into 26 barangays.

Climate

Demographics

Economy

Notable personalities

 Felix Makasiar, 14th Chief Justice of the Philippine Supreme Court

References

External links

 [ Philippine Standard Geographic Code]
Philippine Census Information
Local Governance Performance Management System

Municipalities of Negros Oriental